The 1996–97 Montreal Canadiens season was the club's 88th season. The Canadiens qualified for the playoffs despite a sub-.500 season. The Canadiens were eliminated in the Eastern Conference quarterfinals (the first round) by the New Jersey Devils 4 games to 1.

Offseason

Regular season
On Wednesday, October 16, 1996, the Canadiens scored three short-handed goals in a 4–2 win over the Calgary Flames.

The Canadiens finished the regular season 26th in both power-play goals allowed (71) and penalty-killing percentage (79.54%).

Final standings

Schedule and results

Playoffs
In the first game of the series against New Jersey, on April 17, 1997, with the Devils up by two goals late in the game, Martin Brodeur fired the puck the length of the ice and into the Canadiens' empty net to ensure a 5-2 victory. It was only the second time in NHL history that a goaltender had scored in the playoffs, and the fifth time overall.

Eastern Conference Quarterfinals vs. New Jersey Devils

Player statistics

Regular season
Scoring

Goaltending

Playoffs
Scoring

Goaltending

Awards and records

Transactions

Draft picks

See also
 1996–97 NHL season

References
 Canadiens on Hockey Database
 Canadiens on NHL Reference

Montreal Canadiens seasons
Montreal Canadiens season, 1996-97
Montreal
Montreal Canadiens
Montreal Canadiens